The Freiberger or Franches-Montagnes is a Swiss breed of horse of light  draught type. It originates in the Canton of Jura in north-western Switzerland, and is named for the Freiberge or Franches-Montagnes District in the south of that canton. It is distributed through Switzerland, and is also present in France and Belgium.

It was formerly used principally as a farm horse or by the Swiss army; it is now used mainly for driving and riding. The Marché Concours is an annual fair for the breed held in Saignelégier, capital of the Franches-Montagnes District.

Breed characteristics

History

The presence of an autochthonous horse breed in the Jura traces to the year 1619.

By the early 19th century, there were active breeders in the district of Franches-Montagnes. In 1817, there were 4,000 breeding mares on record. The horses were bred for use in agriculture and by the army as pack animals and artillery draft horses. There are records of imports of Anglo-Norman horses for the year 1821, and of other horses from England, France, Hanover and Oldenburg for the year 1830, with the goal to overcome the faults of the landrace breed, which was viewed as inferior, due to its heavy and thick head, short neck and sloping rump, though its overall build was considered excellent.

The name Freiberger appeared in the late 19th century, used for the three types of horse previously named after the districts of Franches-Montagnes, Porrentruy, and Delémont. These types were called cheval de Jura and later Franches-Montagnes regardless of the district from which they originated. They also had been called race welsche.

Until the early 20th century, it was also common to employ names for the sub-types, such as Anglo-Jura for animals with Thoroughbred admixture, or Normand-Jura for those with Anglo-Norman ancestry. It was only in the late 20th century that the name (Cheval des) Franches-Montagnes became official.

The Marché-Concours des Chevaux in Saignelégier, a combined show, race and market dedicated to the breed, has been held annually since 1897. 

The breed was crossed with Swedish Warmblood in the 1970s, especially in Alsatian studs. By 1985, about half of the breeding population were descended from these Alsatian types, with the more traditional types becoming increasingly scarce. The last admixtures to date took place in the early 1990s, with Swiss Warmblood, with the intention of increasing the breed's suitability as a riding horse. Since 1997, the breed's studbook has been closed to any external admixture.
In the same year, a Swiss federation of breeders was established, Schweizerischer Freibergerverband (FM) / Fédération suisse d’élevage du cheval de la race des Franches-Montagnes (FSFM). They were, as of 2016, bred with strict regulation at the Avenches federal stud.

References

External links

A site about Freibergers (French and German)
www.derfreiberger.de Information about the race and character of Freibergers (English/German)
A Canadian site about Freibergers (English)

Horse breeds
Horse breeds originating in Switzerland